, formerly , is a producer of bicycles and cycling accessories. The "Panasonic" brand was (together with the "National" brand) used by Matsushita for bicycles long before Matsushita changed its name to Panasonic. Konosuke Matsushita grew up with a family who owned a bicycle shop and always  had a love and passion toward bicycles. He later on founded the Panasonic bicycle line. Panasonic bicycles were very well built, and produced in steel, aluminum and titanium. Some of the road models were used in the Tour de France. 

 Panasonic has competed with bicycle companies like Miyata, Bridgestone, Maruishi, Nichibei Fuji, and Motobécane. The types of bicycles Panasonic produced ranged from mamachari, commuter, road, touring, to track racing models. According to the Panasonic Bike Museum, other bicycle producers sold rebadged Panasonic bicycles at various times such as Royce Union, Schwinn and Raleigh.

See also
Panasonic Sport Deluxe

External links
Panasonic bicycles 
Darin Nederhoff, Panasonic Bicycles Virtual Museum

Cycle manufacturers of Japan
Panasonic